{{DISPLAYTITLE:C13H10O}}
The molecular formula C13H10O (molar mass: 182.22 g/mol, exact mass: 182.0732 u) may refer to:

 Benzophenone
 Fluorenol
 Xanthene (9H-xanthene, 10H-9-oxaanthracene)